First Person View, or FPV, drone racing is a sport where participants control "drones" (typically small radio-controlled aircraft or quadcopters), equipped with cameras while wearing head-mounted displays showing the live stream camera feed. Similar to full-size air racing, the goal is to complete a course as quickly as possible. Drone racing began in Germany in 2011 with a number of amateur pilots getting together for semi-organized races in Karlsruhe.

Technology 
FPV (first person view) flying means that pilots only see what the drone sees. This is accomplished by live streaming footage from a camera mounted on the nose of the drone. The image is transmitted as analog video (typically 2.4 GHz or 5.8 GHz frequency, 1.3 GHz for distant transmission) to goggles or monitor worn by the pilot. The remote control, drone, and goggles are all connected via radio and must transmit with sufficient speed and reliability to allow effective control. FPV goggles on the market range from $40 to $800, with the more expensive goggles offering more and better features. Some of these features include receiver diversity, digital HD video, head tracking, multiple frequency settings, band settings and DVR (digital video recorder) recording functionality. Digital video systems offer much better image quality and are now becoming much more commonplace.

While the pilot always requires goggles, some drone racing organizations insist they should also be used among spectators alike by simply switching the frequency to the channel of the racer one wants to watch, although this can only be done with drones with analog video transmission, as digital transmission is usually a one-to-one pairing to the pilot. Any drone could be used to race, however competitive FPV racing leagues require drones to meet certain standards.

For competitions, aircraft are typically separated into classes, separating winged craft from rotorcraft; and also categorizing by size and power. MultiGP, a community of pilots, defines community produced specifications for aircraft classes.

The Drone Racing League (DRL) makes all of the drones used in its events in house; pilots are supplied with drones, backup drones, and parts by the league itself, not independently.

DR1 Racing, utilizes an open spec class format that relies on each team in the series to supply their own drones, goggles and gear. Recently they added the Pro Class racing drone, which is currently the largest competitive drone racing format in the world.

Racing drones are designed for speed and agility, as opposed to a photography/video drones which are focused more on hovering and stable filming. A photography quadcopter design will typically have four motors configured in an X-pattern, all equally spaced apart. A racing model will typically have its four motors configured in an H-pattern configured to thrust the drone forward, not up. Another specific characteristic of drone racing is the number of propeller's blades. 3-blade or 4-blade (instead of 2-blade) propellers have a shorter diameter allowing for a smaller frame with increased acceleration and maneuverability capabilities. Because of their light weight and electric motors with large amounts of torque, drones can accelerate and maneuver with great speed and agility. This makes for very sensitive controls and requires a pilot with quick reaction times and a steady hand. Racing drones also have their cameras situated at the front of the drone, since the drone always flies forwards, and the pilot needs to be able to navigate. Photography drones usually have high quality cameras situated underneath the drone body with a gimbal, which allows the drone film from above while hovering.

BMW held the Drone Racing League’s 2018 Semi Finals race at their automobile museum, the BMW Welt, in Munich, Germany and sold out the event with 3,000 fans.

Course design
MultiGP provides community standards for their chapters to safely design their own courses and also generates individual pilot competition through their Universal Time Trial Track program which ranks pilots worldwide on standard measured courses.

DRL creates complex, three-dimensional racecourses in locations internationally. The Sci-Fi inspired tracks stretch around a mile-long.

DR1 Racing's Champions Series is an outdoor racing circuit, flying in iconic locations around the world.  Each location or race uses a mixture of environmental and manmade elements to create the course. The courses for the 2017 season include the Trona Pinnacles, the Mojave Boneyard at the Mojave Air and Space Port, the DHL Bonn Post Tower, Bunowen Castle in Ireland, Spike Island, and Isle of Man TT.  DR1's Micro Series uses indoor locations, with thematic elements.

Others such as the U.S. National Drone Racing Championship tend to conduct their races in open areas with less catastrophic obstacles (flags and cones vs. walls and tunnels). [5]

Major Organizations

FPV racing organizations create regulations and rules to offer a fair race among its pilots.

 MultiGP – MultiGP is the only organization with chapters all around the world. MultiGP governs and sanctions drone racing events internationally. Official Special Interest Group of the Academy of Model Aeronautics for first person view racing.  The organization is a drone racing league which hosts frequent competition-based tournaments, free-fly gatherings and casual events.
 Drone Racing League (or DRL) (For Profit) is a television program where invited pilots are filmed competing in drone races. Pilots are invited to participate in several races as part of the DRL's global racing circuit. The races are filmed and edited into hour-long episodes that air on ESPN, SKY Sports and others. DRL is viewable in over 75 countries across the world and was set to broadcast their third season in 2018.
 Airspeeder is the world's first racing series for manned electric flying cars. Alauda will provide teams with identical craft, known as ‘Speeders’. Teams will then be given the freedom to set drivers and create strategy. Races will take place in remote locations across the globe. The speeders are manned racing electric quadcopters that can fly at speeds of up to 200 km/h. DHL is the series’ global logistics partner and EQUALS is Airpseeder's FX partner.
Freespace Drone Racing (Previously known as Freedom Class) – is the world's first giant drone racing league. The aircraft are the largest and most powerful racing drones ever built, designed specifically as a spectator sport. With successful tests occurring throughout 2016 and 2017, the first international series is set to take place in late 2020. Freespace also operates the FS500, a mid-size (500mm) racing drone, geared for live spectators and live broadcast, as a steppingstone for professional pilots getting into giant drone racing The FAI partnered with Freespace Drone Racing in 2017 to professionalize the drone racing industry, across multiple international events, including the 2018 Barcelona Drone Racing World Cup.
 Fédération Aéronautique Internationale (FAI) – World governing body for air sports. Recognized by the International Olympic Committee. The Federation coordinates the organization of the FAI Drone Racing World Cup and the FAI World Drone Racing Championship.
 Drone Sports Association (DSA) (For Profit) – The Drone Sports Association (Formerly RotorSports) was the oldest drone racing and drone sports organization worldwide.
 International Drone Racing Association (IDRA) (For Profit) – The International Drone Racing Association is a professional racing organization that sanctions and governs multiple drone racing events
Drone Champions League (DCL) (For Profit) – Seven permanent teams with at least four pilots fly in the DCL. The teams at the races are complemented by local wild card teams. 2018 is the 3rd season of the DCL and so far, three races have been held, two more will follow. The DCL is sponsored by Breitling as official timekeeper, Red Bull and Trilux. The Drone Champions League races are broadcast live.

Past major events 

 2020 FAI Drone Racing World Championship, was placed on hold due to COVID-19 and no official rankings and awards were given.
 2019 FAI 2nd Drone Racing World Championship, was again held in China at Xiangshan Ningbo. The winner was from South Korea. Changhyeon Kang (16 years of age) won over former champion Thomas Bitmatta.
 2018 FAI 1st Drone Racing World Championship, held in Shenzhen, China. This event was broadcast live across multiple channels, including the Olympic Channel. The race was won by a 17-year-old Australian, over 128 competitors from 34 countries.
 2017 DR1 Racing's DHL Champions Series Fueled by Mountain Dew. This team-based drone racing series consisted of 6 races in locations around the world. The Finals of this racing series were held on the Isle of Man TT, and aired on CBS and Eurosport. The broadcast of the Series Finals on CBS drew the largest audience ever for a professional drone race on network television, grabbing a 0.4 share and 559,000 viewers.
 2016 World Drone Prix, Dubai – World's biggest and most lucrative drone race, with a total prize fund of US$1 million.  
 2016 U.S. National Drone Racing Championships Presented by GoPro New York – The second annual event was held August 7 on New York City's Governor's Island.  145 pilots competed in the event for a total prize purse of $57,000.
 2016 MultiGP National Championships, Indiana – The second annual event was held at the Academy of Model Aeronautics (AMA) headquarters in Muncie Indiana on September 4, 2016. Over 140 pilots arrived on-site to battle for this Championship event and a chance at the $15,000 prize purse.
 2016 World Drone Racing Championships took place October 20–22 in Kualoa Ranch, Island of Oahu, Hawaii, USA 
 In 2016, TOS Asia Cup Shanghai and China Drone National was the largest FPV Drone Racing in Asia over 140 registered pilots and 15 countries participated the event.
 The 2016 DR1 Invitational was the most watched drone racing event of the year, airing on Discovery Channel and Eurosport broadcasting in over 70 countries around the world.  The race was held in Sepulveda Dam where pilots navigated through the dam's opening as well as various gates on the course.
 2015 US Fat Shark National Drone Racing Championships, California – The first annual U.S. National Drone Racing Championships were held in 2015. This event was held in a stadium at the California State Fair. The prize for winning the competition was $25,000 and was competed for by over 100 competitors. Chad Nowak, an Australian, won all three events including the individual time trial, was on the winning team trial squad, and won the freestyle trick event. This gave him the title of 2015 Drone Racing National Champion.

Events and venues

United States
The U.S. National Drone Racing Championship took place at the 2015 California State Fair. It was a 2-day event with a $25,000 cash prize that attracted over 120 competitors. This was the first event like this in the US, however other countries such as France, Australia and the UK had previously held similar events.
  In 2016, the annual MultiGP Championship was held at the Academy of Model Aeronautics' headquarters in Muncie, Indiana where over 120 pilots competed by qualifying through the MultiGP Regional Series which consists of qualifying events and regional finals in 15 regions across the United States.

MultiGP is a global, professional, drone racing league with over 1000 chapters internationally including locations such as Australia, Asia, South Africa and Europe.

United Kingdom

The British Drone Racing League (BDRL) has recently setup and will operate a number of professional events. These events are currently being organized and will follow compliance from the CAA.

Funding 
DRL is the only league so far that has established major outside sources of funding. DRL has raised more than $30mm in venture capital backing from entities across the sports, technology and media space. Some notable investors include: Sky, Liberty Media (also owners of Formula 1), MGM, CAA, Hearst, WWE, Lux Capital, and RSE Ventures. In addition, DRL has a number of high-profile sponsors, including Allianz, BMW, the US Air Force, and Swatch. It also has other lines of business, including a licensing deal with Toy State, a toy manufacturing company best known for their Nikko remote control car line. Finally, DRL has content licensing deals with networks around the world including ESPN and Disney XD in the United States, Sky Sports in the UK, OSN in the middle east, and the Fox Sports in Asia. This funding has been crucial to the development of the league, and allows them to advertise and hold their races in better venues that will attract larger crowds.

Other smaller and less established leagues have found it difficult to find funding. At events like the one held at the California State Fair, funding comes from the state and from ticket sales at the event. Along with the difficulties of finding funding, it creates problems of finding good venues that create a challenge for the pilots and also have key turns and straightaways adding to the exhilaration of these events. US Army veteran Brett Velicovich has been involved in the launch of drone racing at the Dew Tour. Outside of DRL, and DR1 which has Mountain Dew as a sponsor, most smaller events are sponsored by FPV manufacturers such as Fat Shark, ImmersionRC and HobbyKing, DYS, T-Motor, EMAX,  Team Black Sheep (TBS).

Simulators 

Drone racing can be also simulated on computers via drone flight simulators such as Velocidrone, Liftoff, neXt, DRL Simulator, etc. Players can use game controllers such as an Xbox or PlayStation controller; however, some radio controllers support plug and play as well. The use of a radio transmitter is preferred among professional pilots due to its superior precision.

Publications

Magazines 
 RotorDrone Pro Magazine.

Podcasts 
 FPV Podcast  – The first podcast to cover drone racing, pilots and key people growing the FPV Community. 
  Failsafe Weekly Podcast – podcast run by the following FPV pilots: Sweepings, Konasty, and Mr Steele.

References

Unmanned aerial vehicles
Air racing
Games and sports introduced in 2013
2010s fads and trends